is an ancient Buddhist temple, that was once one of the  powerful Seven Great Temples, in Nara, Japan.

History
The original foundation of the temple was by Soga no Umako in Asuka, as Asuka-dera. The temple was moved to Nara in 718, following the capital relocation to Heijō-kyō.
 
Gangō-ji initially held as many as seven halls and pagodas in its precincts, which occupied a wide area within what is now Naramachi, the preserved district of modern Nara city. The original architecture was lost in fires during the 15th through 19th centuries (Muromachi and Edo periods respectively).

Architecture

This site is a part of a group of temples, shrines and other places in Nara that UNESCO has designated as World Heritage Site "Historic Monuments of Ancient Nara", and holds three national treasures:

 the Zen room
 the miniature (5.5 meters tall) five-story pagoda

Most of the destroyed complex ground has been altered and melded with parts of Naramachi over the course of time. Another small part of the temple remains today as the other Gangō-ji, of a Kegon school but with few remainders in terms of architecture.

In the Man'yōshū 

The Man'yōshū includes a poem attributed to a monk of Gango-ji.  This poet laments that, having attained enlightenment, his greater understanding remains unnoticed by others in the streets of Nara.  His poem may perhaps bemoan his undervalued condition—and yet, in a modest way, his words transport contemporary readers momentarily back to share his quiet, 8th century perspective:

A White gem unknown of men –
  Be it so if no one knows!
Since I myself know its worth
Although no other –
Be it so if no one knows!
  – A monk of the Gango-ji Temple

See also
Asuka-dera
 Gangōji Garan Engi, a historical text of the temple
 Nanto Shichi Daiji, Seven Great Temples of Nanto.
List of National Treasures of Japan (temples)
List of National Treasures of Japan (sculptures)
 For an explanation of terms concerning Japanese Buddhism, Japanese Buddhist art, and Japanese Buddhist temple architecture, see the Glossary of Japanese Buddhism.

Notes

External links 

Gangoji Temple, from The Official Nara Travel Guide 

Shingon Ritsu temples
World Heritage Sites in Japan
National Treasures of Japan
Buddhist temples in Nara, Nara
Historic Sites of Japan
6th-century establishments in Japan
Sanron-shū
Religious buildings and structures completed in 593
6th-century Buddhist temples